Physical therapy (PT), also known as physiotherapy, is one of the allied health professions. It is provided by physical therapists who promote, maintain, or restore health through physical examination, diagnosis, management, prognosis, patient education, physical intervention, rehabilitation, disease prevention, and health promotion. Physical therapists are known as physiotherapists in many countries.

The career has many specialties including musculoskeletal, orthopedics, cardiopulmonary, neurology, endocrinology, sports medicine, geriatrics, pediatrics, women's health, wound care and electromyography. PTs practice in many settings, both public and private.

In addition to clinical practice, other aspects of physical therapist practice include research, education, consultation, and health administration. Physical therapy is provided as a primary care treatment or alongside, or in conjunction with, other medical services. In some jurisdictions, such as the United Kingdom, physical therapists have the authority to prescribe medication.

Overview
Physical therapy addresses the illnesses or injuries that limit a person's abilities to move and perform functional activities in their daily lives. PTs use an individual's history and physical examination to arrive at a diagnosis and establish a management plan and, when necessary, incorporate the results of laboratory and imaging studies like X-rays, CT-scan, or MRI findings. Electrodiagnostic testing (e.g., electromyograms and nerve conduction velocity testing) may also be used.

PT management commonly includes prescription of or assistance with specific exercises, manual therapy, and manipulation, mechanical devices such as traction, education, electrophysical modalities which include heat, cold, electricity, sound waves, radiation, assistive devices, prostheses, orthoses, and other interventions. In addition, PTs work with individuals to prevent the loss of mobility before it occurs by developing fitness and wellness-oriented programs for healthier and more active lifestyles, providing services to individuals and populations to develop, maintain and restore maximum movement and functional ability throughout the lifespan. This includes providing treatment in circumstances where movement and function are threatened by aging, injury, disease, or environmental factors. Functional movement is central to what it means to be healthy.

Physical therapy is a professional career which has many specialties including musculoskeletal, orthopedics, cardiopulmonary, neurology, endocrinology, sports medicine, geriatrics, pediatrics, women's health, wound care and electromyography. Neurological rehabilitation is, in particular, a rapidly emerging field. PTs practice in many settings, such as private-owned physical therapy clinics, outpatient clinics or offices, health and wellness clinics, rehabilitation hospitals facilities, skilled nursing facilities, extended care facilities, private homes, education, and research centers, schools, hospices, industrial and these workplaces or other occupational environments, fitness centers and sports training facilities.

Physical therapists also practice in the non-patient care roles such as health policy, health insurance, health care administration and as health care executives. Physical therapists are involved in the medical-legal field serving as experts, performing peer review and independent medical examinations.

Education varies greatly by country. The span of education ranges from some countries having little formal education to others having doctoral degrees and post-doctoral residencies and fellowships.

History

Physicians like Hippocrates and later Galen are believed to have been the first practitioners of physical therapy, advocating massage, manual therapy techniques and hydrotherapy to treat people in 460 BC. After the development of orthopedics in the eighteenth century, machines like the Gymnasticon were developed to treat gout and similar diseases by systematic exercise of the joints, similar to later developments in physical therapy.

The earliest documented origins of actual physical therapy as a professional group date back to Per Henrik Ling, "Father of Swedish Gymnastics," who founded the Royal Central Institute of Gymnastics (RCIG) in 1813 for manipulation, and exercise. Up until 2014, the Swedish word for a physical therapist was sjukgymnast = someone involved in gymnastics for those who are ill, but the title was then changed to fysioterapeut (physiotherapist), the word used in the other Scandinavian countries. In 1887, PTs were given official registration by Sweden's National Board of Health and Welfare. Other countries soon followed. In 1894, four nurses in Great Britain formed the Chartered Society of Physiotherapy. The School of Physiotherapy at the University of Otago in New Zealand in 1913, and the United States 1914 Reed College in Portland, Oregon, which graduated "reconstruction aides." Since the profession's inception, spinal manipulative therapy has been a component of the physical therapist practice.

Modern physical therapy was established towards the end of the 19th century due to events that affected on a global scale, which called for rapid advances in physical therapy. Soon following American orthopedic surgeons began treating children with disabilities and began employing women trained in physical education, and remedial exercise. These treatments were applied and promoted further during the Polio outbreak of 1916. During the First World War, women were recruited to work with and restore physical function to injured soldiers, and the field of physical therapy was institutionalized. In 1918 the term "Reconstruction Aide" was used to refer to individuals practicing physical therapy. The first school of physical therapy was established at Walter Reed Army Hospital in Washington, D.C., following the outbreak of World War I. Research catalyzed the physical therapy movement. The first physical therapy research was published in the United States in March 1921 in "The PT Review." In the same year, Mary McMillan organized the American Women's Physical Therapeutic Association (now called the American Physical Therapy Association (APTA). In 1924, the Georgia Warm Springs Foundation promoted the field by touting physical therapy as a treatment for polio.
Treatment through the 1940s primarily consisted of exercise, massage, and traction. Manipulative procedures to the spine and extremity joints began to be practiced, especially in the British Commonwealth countries, in the early 1950s. Around the time that polio vaccines were developed, physical therapists became a normal occurrence in hospitals throughout North America and Europe. In the late 1950s, physical therapists started to move beyond hospital-based practice to outpatient orthopedic clinics, public schools, colleges/universities health-centres, geriatric settings (skilled nursing facilities), rehabilitation centers and medical centers. Specialization in physical therapy in the U.S. occurred in 1974, with the Orthopaedic Section of the APTA being formed for those physical therapists specializing in orthopedics. In the same year, the International Federation of Orthopaedic Manipulative Physical Therapists was formed, which has ever since played an important role in advancing manual therapy worldwide.

Education

Educational criteria for physical therapy providers vary from state to state, country to country, and among various levels of professional responsibility. Most U.S. states have physical therapy practice acts that recognize both physical therapists (PT) and physical therapist assistants (PTA) and some jurisdictions also recognize physical therapy technicians (PT Techs) or aides. Most countries have licensing bodies that require physical therapists to be a member of before they can start practicing as independent professionals.

Canada

Canadian physiotherapy programs are offered at 15 universities, often through the university's respective college of medicine. Each of Canada's physical therapy schools has transitioned from 3-year Bachelor of Science in Physical Therapy (BScPT) programs that required 2 years of prerequisite university courses (5-year bachelor's degree) to 2-year Master's of Physical Therapy (MPT) programs that require prerequisite bachelor's degrees. The last Canadian university to follow suit was the University of Manitoba which transitioned to the MPT program in 2012, making the MPT credential the new entry to practice standard across Canada. Existing practitioners with BScPT credentials are not required to upgrade their qualifications.

In the province of Quebec, prospective physiotherapists are required to have completed a college diploma in either health sciences, which lasts on average two years, or physical rehabilitation technology, which lasts at least three years, to apply to a physiotherapy program or program in university. Following admission, physical therapy students work on a bachelor of science with a major in physical therapy and rehabilitation. The B.Sc. usually requires three years to complete. Students must then enter graduate school to complete a master's degree in physical therapy, which normally requires one and a half to two years of study. Graduates who obtain their M.Sc. must successfully pass the membership examination to become members of the Ordre Professionnel de la physiothérapie du Québec (PPQ). Physiotherapists can pursue their education in such fields as rehabilitation sciences, sports medicine, kinesiology, and physiology.

In the province of Quebec, physical rehabilitation therapists are health care professionals who are required to complete a three-year college diploma program in physical rehabilitation therapy and be members of the Ordre Professionnel de la physiothérapie du Québec (OPPQ) to practice legally in the country according to specialist De Van Gerard.

Most physical rehabilitation therapists complete their college diploma at Collège Montmorency, Dawson College, or Cégep Marie-Victorin, all situated in and around the Montreal area.

After completing their technical college diploma, graduates have the opportunity to pursue their studies at the university level to perhaps obtain a bachelor's degree in physiotherapy, kinesiology, exercise science, or occupational therapy. The Université de Montréal, the Université Laval and the Université de Sherbrooke are among the Québécois universities that admit physical rehabilitation therapists in their programs of study related to health sciences and rehabilitation to credit courses that were completed in college.

To date, there are no bridging programs available to facilitate upgrading from the BScPT to the MPT credential. However, research Master's of Science (MSc) and Doctor of Philosophy (Ph.D.) programs are available at every university. Aside from academic research, practitioners can upgrade their skills and qualifications through continuing education courses and curriculums. Continuing education is a requirement of the provincial regulatory bodies.

The Canadian Alliance of Physiotherapy Regulators (CAPR) offers eligible program graduates to apply for the national Physiotherapy Competency Examination (PCE). Passing the PCE is one of the requirements in most provinces and territories to work as a licensed physiotherapist in Canada. CAPR has members which are physiotherapy regulatory organizations recognized in their respective provinces and territories:
 Government of Yukon, Consumer Services
 College of Physical Therapists of British Columbia
 Physiotherapy Alberta College + Association
 Saskatchewan College of Physical Therapists
 College of Physiotherapists of Manitoba
 College of Physiotherapists of Ontario
 Ordre professionnel de la physiothérapie du Québec
 College of Physiotherapists of New Brunswick/Collège des physiothérapeutes du Nouveau-Brunswick
 Nova Scotia College of Physiotherapists
 Prince Edward Island College of Physiotherapists
 Newfoundland & Labrador College of Physiotherapists

The Canadian Physiotherapy Association offers a curriculum of continuing education courses in orthopedics and manual therapy. The program consists of 5 levels (7 courses) of training with ongoing mentorship and evaluation at each level. The orthopedic curriculum and examinations take a minimum of 4 years to complete. However, upon completion of level 2, physiotherapists can apply to a unique 1-year course-based Master's program in advanced orthopedics and manipulation at the University of Western Ontario to complete their training. This program accepts only 16 physiotherapists annually since 2007. Successful completion of either of these education streams and their respective examinations allows physiotherapists the opportunity to apply to the Canadian Academy of Manipulative Physiotherapy (CAMPT) for fellowship. Fellows of the Canadian Academy of manipulative Physiotherapists (FCAMPT) are considered leaders in the field, having extensive post-graduate education in orthopedics and manual therapy. FCAMPT is an internationally recognized credential, as CAMPT is a member of the International Federation of Manipulative Physiotherapists (IFOMPT), a branch of the World Confederation of Physical Therapy (WCPT) and the World Health Organization (WHO).

Scotland
Physiotherapy degrees are offered at three universities: Robert Gordon University in Aberdeen, Glasgow Caledonian University in Glasgow, and Queen Margaret University in Edinburgh. Students can qualify as physiotherapists by completing a four-year Bachelor of Science degree or a two-year master's degree (if they already have an undergraduate degree in a related field).

To use the title 'Physiotherapist', a student must register with the Health and Care Professions Council, a UK-wide regulatory body, on qualifying. Many physiotherapists are also members of the Chartered Society of Physiotherapists (CSP), which provides insurance and professional support.

United States 
The primary physical therapy practitioner is the Physical Therapist (PT) who is trained and licensed to examine, evaluate, diagnose and treat impairment, functional limitations, and disabilities in patients or clients. Physical therapist education curricula in the United States culminate in a Doctor of Physical Therapy (DPT) degree, with some practicing PTs holding a Master of Physical Therapy degree, and some with a Bachelor's degree. The Master of Physical Therapy and Master of Science in Physical Therapy degrees are no longer offered, and the entry-level degree is the Doctor of Physical Therapy degree, which typically takes 3 years after completing a bachelor's degree. PTs who hold a Masters or bachelors in PT are encouraged to get their DPT because APTA's goal is for all PT's to be on a doctoral level. WCPT recommends physical therapist entry-level educational programs be based on university or university-level studies, of a minimum of four years, independently validated and accredited. Curricula in the United States are accredited by the Commission on Accreditation in Physical Therapy Education (CAPTE). According to CAPTE,  there are 31,380 students currently enrolled in 227 accredited PT programs in the United States while 12,945 PTA students are currently enrolled in 331 PTA programs in the United States. (Updated CAPTE statistics list that for 2015–2016, there were 30,419 students enrolled in 233 accredited PT programs in the United States.)

The physical therapist professional curriculum includes content in the clinical sciences (e.g., content about the cardiovascular, pulmonary, endocrine, metabolic, gastrointestinal, genitourinary, integumentary, musculoskeletal, and neuromuscular systems and the medical and surgical conditions frequently seen by physical therapists). Current training is specifically aimed to enable physical therapists to appropriately recognize and refer non-musculoskeletal diagnoses that may present similarly to those caused by systems not appropriate for physical therapy intervention, which has resulted in direct access to physical therapists in many states.

Post-doctoral residency and fellowship education prevalence is increasing steadily with 219 residency, and 42 fellowship programs accredited in 2016. Residencies are aimed to train physical therapists in a specialty such as acute care, cardiovascular & pulmonary, clinical electrophysiology, faculty, geriatrics, neurology, orthopaedics, pediatrics, sports, women's health, and wound care, whereas fellowships train specialists in a subspecialty (e.g. critical care, hand therapy, and division 1 sports), similar to the medical model. Residency programs offer eligibility to sit for the specialist certification in their respective area of practice. For example, completion of an orthopedic physical therapy residency, allows its graduates to apply and sit for the clinical specialist examination in orthopedics, achieving the OCS designation upon passing the examination. Board certification of physical therapy specialists is aimed to recognize individuals with advanced clinical knowledge and skill training in their respective area of practice, and exemplifies the trend toward greater education to optimally treat individuals with movement dysfunction.

Physical therapist assistants may deliver treatment and physical interventions for patients and clients under a care plan established by and under the supervision of a physical therapist. Physical therapist assistants in the United States are currently trained under associate of applied sciences curricula specific to the profession, as outlined and accredited by CAPTE. As of August 2011, there were 276 accredited two-year (Associate degree) programs for physical therapist assistants In the United States of America. According to CAPTE, as of 2012 there are 10,598 students currently enrolled in 280 accredited PTA programs in the United States. Updated CAPTE statistics list that for 2015–2016, there are 12,726 students enrolled in 340 accredited PTA programs in the United States.

Curricula for the physical therapist assistant associate degree include:
 Anatomy & physiology
 Exercise physiology
 Human biology
 Physics
 Biomechanics
 Kinesiology
 Neuroscience
 Clinical pathology
 Behavioral sciences
 Communication
 Ethics
 Research
 Other coursework as required by individual programs

Job duties and education requirements for Physical Therapy Technicians or Aides may vary depending on the employer, but education requirements range from a high school diploma or equivalent to completion of a 2-year degree program. O-Net reports that 64% of PT Aides/Techs have a high school diploma or equivalent, 21% have completed some college but do not hold a degree, and 10% hold an associate degree.

Some jurisdictions allow physical therapists to employ technicians or aides or therapy assistants to perform designated routine tasks related to physical therapy under the direct supervision of a physical therapist. Some jurisdictions require physical therapy technicians or aides to be certified, and education and certification requirements vary among jurisdictions.

Employment
Physical therapy-related jobs in North America have shown rapid growth in recent years, but employment rates and average wages may vary significantly between different countries, states, provinces, or regions. A study from 2013 states that 56.4% of physical therapists were globally satisfied with their jobs. Salary, interest in work, and fulfillment in a job are important predictors of job satisfaction. In a Polish study, job burnout among the physical therapists was manifested by increased emotional exhaustion and decreased sense of personal achievement. Emotional exhaustion is significantly higher among physical therapists working with adults and employed in hospitals. Other factors that increased burnout include working in a hospital setting and having seniority from 15 to 19 years.

United States
According to the United States Department of Labor's Bureau of Labor Statistics, there were approximately 210,900 physical therapists employed in the United States in 2014, earning an average of $84,020 annually in 2015, or $40.40 per hour, with 34% growth in employment projected by 2024. The Bureau of Labor Statistics also reports that there were approximately 128,700 Physical Therapist Assistants and Aides employed in the United States in 2014, earning an average $42,980 annually, or $20.66 per hour, with 40% growth in employment projected by 2024. To meet their needs, many healthcare and physical therapy facilities hire "travel physical therapists", who work temporary assignments between 8 and 26 weeks for much higher wages; about $113,500 a year. Bureau of Labor Statistics data on PTAs and Techs can be difficult to decipher, due to their tendency to report data on these job fields collectively rather than separately. O-Net reports that in 2015, PTAs in the United States earned a median wage of $55,170 annually or $26.52 hourly and that Aides/Techs earned a median wage of $25,120 annually or $12.08 hourly in 2015. The American Physical Therapy Association reports vacancy rates for physical therapists as 11.2% in outpatient private practice, 10% in acute care settings, and 12.1% in skilled nursing facilities. The APTA also reports turnover rates for physical therapists as 10.7% in outpatient private practice, 11.9% in acute care settings, 27.6% in skilled nursing facilities.

Definitions and licensing requirements in the United States vary among jurisdictions, as each state has enacted its own physical therapy practice act defining the profession within its jurisdiction, but the Federation of State Boards of Physical Therapy  has also drafted a model definition to limit this variation. The Commission on Accreditation in Physical Therapy Education  (CAPTE) is responsible for accrediting physical therapy education curricula throughout the United States of America.

United Kingdom 
The title of Physiotherapist is a protected professional title in the United Kingdom. Anyone using this title must be registered with the Health & Care Professions Council (HCPC). Physiotherapists must complete the necessary qualifications, usually an undergraduate physiotherapy degree (at university or as an intern), a master rehabilitation degree, or a doctoral degree in physiotherapy.  This is typically followed by supervised professional experience lasting two to three years. All professionals on the HCPC register must comply with continuing professional development (CPD) and can be audited for this evidence at intervals.

Specialty areas

The body of knowledge of physical therapy is large, and therefore physical therapists may specialize in a specific clinical area. While there are many different types of physical therapy, the American Board of Physical Therapy Specialties lists ten current specialist certifications. Most Physical Therapists practicing in a specialty will have undergone further training, such as an accredited residency program, although individuals are currently able to sit for their specialist examination after 2,000 hours of focused practice in their respective specialty population, in addition to requirements set by each respective specialty board.

Cardiovascular and pulmonary
Cardiovascular and pulmonary rehabilitation respiratory practitioners and physical therapists offer therapy for a wide variety of cardiopulmonary disorders or pre and post cardiac or pulmonary surgery. An example of cardiac surgery is coronary bypass surgery. The primary goals of this specialty include increasing endurance and functional independence. Manual therapy is used in this field to assist in clearing lung secretions experienced with cystic fibrosis. Pulmonary disorders, heart attacks, post coronary bypass surgery, chronic obstructive pulmonary disease, and pulmonary fibrosis, treatments can benefit from cardiovascular and pulmonary specialized physical therapists.

Clinical electrophysiology
This specialty area includes electrotherapy/physical agents, electrophysiological evaluation (EMG/NCV), physical agents, and wound management.

Geriatric
Geriatric physical therapy covers a wide area of issues concerning people as they go through normal adult aging but is usually focused on the older adult. There are many conditions that affect many people as they grow older and include but are not limited to the following: arthritis, osteoporosis, cancer, Alzheimer's disease, hip and joint replacement, balance disorders, incontinence, etc. Geriatric physical therapists specialize in providing therapy for such conditions in older adults.

Physical rehabilitation can prevent deterioration in health and activities of daily living among care home residents. The current evidence suggests benefits to physical health from participating in different types of physical rehabilitation to improve daily living, strength, flexibility, balance, mood, memory, exercise tolerance, fear of falling, injuries, and death. It may be both safe and effective in improving physical and possibly mental state, while reducing disability with few adverse events.

The current body of evidence suggests that physical rehabilitation may be effective for long-term care residents in reducing disability with few adverse events. However, there is insufficient to conclude whether the beneficial effects are sustainable and cost-effective. The findings are based on moderate quality evidence.

Wound management
Wound management physical therapy includes the treatment of conditions involving the skin and all its related organs. Common conditions managed include wounds and burns. Physical therapists may utilize surgical instruments, wound irrigations, dressings, and topical agents to remove the damaged or contaminated tissue and promote tissue healing. Other commonly used interventions include exercise, edema control, splinting, and compression garments. The work done by physical therapists in the integumentary specialty does work similar to what would be done by medical doctors or nurses in the emergency room or triage.

Neurology
Neurological physical therapy is a field focused on working with individuals who have a neurological disorder or disease. These can include stroke, chronic back pain, Alzheimer's disease, Charcot-Marie-Tooth disease (CMT), ALS, brain injury, cerebral palsy, multiple sclerosis, Parkinson's disease, facial palsy and spinal cord injury. Common impairments associated with neurologic conditions include impairments of vision, balance, ambulation, activities of daily living, movement, muscle strength and loss of functional independence. The techniques involve in neurological physical therapy are wide-ranging and often require specialized training.

Neurological physiotherapy is also called neurophysiotherapy or neurological rehabilitation. It is recommended for neurophysiotherapists to collaborate with psychologists when providing physical treatment of movement disorders. This is especially important because combining physical therapy and psychotherapy can improve neurological status of the patients.

Orthopaedics

Orthopedic physical therapists diagnose, manage, and treat disorders and injuries of the musculoskeletal system including rehabilitation after orthopedic surgery, acute trauma such as sprains, strains, injuries of insidious onset such as tendinopathy, bursitis, and deformities like scoliosis. This specialty of physical therapy is most often found in the outpatient clinical setting. Orthopedic therapists are trained in the treatment of post-operative orthopedic procedures, fractures, acute sports injuries, arthritis, sprains, strains, back and neck pain, spinal conditions, and amputations.

Joint and spine mobilization/manipulation, dry needling (similar to acupuncture), therapeutic exercise, neuromuscular techniques, muscle reeducation, hot/cold packs, and electrical muscle stimulation (e.g., cryotherapy, iontophoresis, electrotherapy) are modalities employed to expedite recovery in the orthopedic setting. Additionally, an emerging adjunct to diagnosis and treatment is the use of sonography for diagnosis and to guide treatments such as muscle retraining. Those with injury or disease affecting the muscles, bones, ligaments, or tendons will benefit from assessment by a physical therapist specialized in orthopedics.

Pediatrics
Pediatric physical therapy assists in the early detection of health problems and uses a variety of modalities to provide physical therapy for disorders in the pediatric population. These therapists are specialized in the diagnosis, treatment, and management of infants, children, and adolescents with a variety of congenital, developmental, neuromuscular, skeletal, or acquired disorders/diseases. Treatments focus mainly on improving gross and fine motor skills, balance and coordination, strength and endurance as well as cognitive and sensory processing/integration.

Sports
Physical therapists are closely involved in the care and wellbeing of athletes including recreational, semi-professional (paid), and professional (full-time employment) participants. This area of practice encompasses athletic injury management under 5 main categories:
 acute care – assessment and diagnosis of an initial injury;
 treatment – application of specialist advice and techniques to encourage healing;
 rehabilitation – progressive management for full return to sport;
 prevention – identification and address of deficiencies known to directly result in, or act as precursors to injury, such as movement assessment     
 education – sharing of specialist knowledge to individual athletes, teams, or clubs to assist in prevention or management of injury 
Physical therapists who work for professional sports teams often have a specialized sports certification issued through their national registering organization. Most Physical therapists who practice in a sporting environment are also active in collaborative sports medicine programs too (See also: athletic trainers).

Women's health
Women's health or pelvic floor physical therapy mostly addresses women's issues related to the female reproductive system, child birth, and post-partum. These conditions include lymphedema, osteoporosis, pelvic pain, prenatal and post-partum periods, and urinary incontinence. It also addresses incontinence, pelvic pain, and other disorders associated with pelvic floor dysfunction. Manual physical therapy has been demonstrated in multiple studies to increase rates of conception in women with infertility.

Oncology
Physical therapy in the field of oncology and palliative care is a continuously evolving and developing specialty, both in malignant and non-malignant diseases. Physical therapy for both groups of patients is now recognized as an essential part of the clinical pathway, as early diagnoses and new treatments are enabling patients to live longer. it is generally accepted that patients should have access to an appropriate level of rehabilitation, so that they can function at a minimum level of dependency and optimize their quality of life, regardless of their life expectancy.

Intensive care unit 
Exercise rehabilitation following intensive care unit discharge for recovery from critical illness

Following intensive care unit discharge for recovery from critical illness, the overall effect of exercise rehabilitation is currently uncertain. Further research in this area is needed as the current body of evidence is very low quality.

Physical therapist–patient collaborative relationship 
A systematic review that included patients with brain injury, musculoskeletal conditions, cardiac conditions, or multiple pathologies found that the alliance between patient and therapist positively correlates with treatment outcome. Outcomes include the ability to perform activities of daily living, manage pain, complete specific physical function tasks, depression, global assessment of physical health, treatment adherence, and treatment satisfaction.

Studies have explored four themes that may influence patient-therapist interactions: interpersonal and communication skills, practical skills, individualized patient-centered care, and organizational and environmental factors. Physical therapists need to be able to effectively communicate with their patients on a variety of levels. Patients have varying levels of health literacy so physical therapists need to take that into account when discussing the patient's ailments as well as planned treatment. Research has shown that using communication tools tailored to the patient's health literacy leads to improved engagement with their practitioner and their clinical care. In addition, patients reported that shared decision-making will yield a positive relationship. Practical skills such as the ability to educate patients about their conditions, and professional expertise are perceived as valuable factors inpatient care. Patients value the ability of a clinician to provide clear and simple explanations about their problems. Furthermore, patients value when physical therapists possess excellent technical skills that improve the patient effectively.

Environmental factors such as the location, equipment used, and parking are less important to the patient than the physical therapy clinical encounter itself.

Based on the current understanding, the most important factors that contribute to the patient-therapist interactions include that the physical therapist: spends an adequate amount of time with the patient, possesses strong listening and communication skills, treats the patient with respect, provides clear explanations of the treatment, and allows the patient to be involved in the treatment decisions.

Effectiveness
Physical therapy has been found to be effective for improving outcomes, both in terms of pain and function, in multiple musculoskeletal conditions. A 2012 systematic review found evidence to support the use of spinal manipulation by physical therapists as a safe option to improve outcomes for lower back pain. According to randomized control trials, a combination of manual therapy and supervised exercise therapy by physiotherapists give functional benefits for patients with osteoarthritis of the knee, and may delay or even prevent the need for surgery. Another randomized controlled study has shown that surgical decompression treatment and physiotherapy are on par for lumbar spinal stenosis in improving symptoms and function. Several studies have suggested that physical therapy, particularly manual therapy techniques focused on the neck and the median nerve, combined with stretching exercises, may be equivalent or even preferable to surgery for Carpal Tunnel Syndrome. A 2015 systematic review suggested that while spine manipulation and therapeutic massage are effective interventions for neck pain, electroacupuncture, strain-counterstrain, relaxation massage, heat therapy, and ultrasound therapy are not as effective, and thus not recommended.

Studies also show physical therapy is effective for patients with other conditions. A 2012 systematic review about the effectiveness of physiotherapy treatment in asthma patients concluded that physiotherapy treatment may improve quality of life, promote cardiopulmonary fitness and inspiratory pressure, as well as reduce symptoms and medication use. Physical therapy is sometimes provided to patients in the ICU, as early mobilization can help reduce ICU and hospital length of stay and improve long-term functional ability. A 2013 systematic review showed that early progressive mobilization for adult, intubated ICU patients on mechanical ventilation is safe and effective.

Results from a 2019 systematic review suggest that psychologically informed physical therapy (PIPT), where a physical therapist treats patients while other members of a multidisciplinary care team help in preoperative planning for patient management of pain and quality of life, helps improve patient outcomes. This is especially present when utilized before and after spine, hip, or knee surgery.

Telehealth 
Telehealth (or telerehabilitation) is a developing form of physical therapy in response to the increasing demand for physical therapy treatment. Telehealth is online communication between the clinician and patient, either live or in pre-recorded sessions with mixed reviews when compared to usual, in-person care. The benefits of telehealth include improved accessibility in remote areas, cost efficiency, and improved convenience for people who are bedridden and home-restricted, or physically disabled. Some considerations for telehealth include: limited evidence to prove effectiveness and compliance more than in-person therapy, licensing and payment policy issues, and compromised privacy. Studies are controversial as to the effectiveness of telehealth in patients with more serious conditions, such as stroke, multiple sclerosis, and lower back pain.

During the COVID-19 pandemic, the need for telehealth came to the fore as patients were less able to safely attend in-person, particularly if the were elderly or had chronic diseases. Telehealth was considered to be a proactive step to prevent decline in individuals that could not attend classes. Physical decline in at risk groups is difficult to address or undo later. The platform licensing or development are found to be the most substantial cost in telehealth. Telehealth does not remove the need for the physical therapist as they still need to oversee the program.

See also 

 American Board of Physical Therapy Specialties
 American Physical Therapy Association
 Basic body-awareness methodology
 Chiropractic
 Doctor (title)
 Doctor of Physical Therapy
 Exercise physiology
 Exercise prescription
 Frenkel exercises
 Joint manipulation
 List of exercise prescription software
 Neurophysiotherapy
 Occupational therapy
 Physical medicine and rehabilitation
 Postural Restoration
 Procovery
 Sports medicine
 Therapy
 World Confederation for Physical Therapy

References

External links 

 Europe: Regulated professions database – Physiotherapist, European Commission

 
Allied health professions
Hospital departments
Manual therapy
Physical exercise
Rehabilitation medicine
Rehabilitation team
Sports medicine
Sports occupations and roles